Dirección General de Aviación Civil is the civil aviation authority of Ecuador. Its head office is in Quito.

The Gestión de Seguridad y Prevención Aeronáutica investigates aviation accidents and incidents.

References

External links

 Dirección General de Aviación Civil 
 Dirección General de Aviación Civil  (Archive)

Ecuador
Organizations investigating aviation accidents and incidents
Government of Ecuador
Aviation organisations based in Ecuador
Civil aviation in Ecuador